4-H Safety Education in Shooting Sports Programs are part of 4-H in the United States, a youth organization administered by the National Institute of Food and Agriculture of the United States Department of Agriculture (USDA), with the mission of "engaging youth to reach their fullest potential while advancing the field of youth development."  The name represents four personal development areas of focus for the organization: head, heart, hands, and health.

4-H program and philosophy

The 4-H organization has over 6.5 million members in the United States, from ages eight to eighteen, in approximately 90,000 clubs.

The goal of 4-H is to develop citizenship, leadership, and life skills of youth through mostly experiential learning programs. Though typically thought of as an agriculturally focused organization as a result of its history, 4-H today focuses on citizenship, healthy living, science, engineering, and technology programs.

Today, 4-H and related programs exist in over 80 countries around the world. Each of these programs operates independently, but cooperatively through international exchanges, global education programs, and communications. Clubs and related organizations now exist in many other countries as well; the organization and administration varies from country to country.

The 4-H motto is "To make the best better", while its slogan is "Learn by doing" (sometimes written as "Learn to do by doing").

The focus of all 4-H programs is the development of youth as individuals and as responsible and productive citizens.

The National 4-H Shooting Sports Program helps  Youths learn marksmanship, the safe and responsible use of firearms, the principles of hunting and archery, and much more. The activities of the program and the support of caring adult leaders provide young people with opportunities to develop life skills, self-worth, and conservation ethics.

Shooting Sports

4-H Safety Education in Shooting Sports programs are run by trained and certified volunteers.  Any adult over the age of 18 may become a certified volunteer to run or assist in a safety education shooting sports program.  Youth over the age of 16 may be certified to participate as a Youth Leader.

To begin a 4-H shooting sports program, an adult contacts their Extension and Outreach service to locate a training program in their area to get certified.  Training programs are often weekend events staffed by unpaid volunteers.  Room and board are often provided and included in the cost for the training which is nominal. The weekend program is divided into multiple segments.  The core of the program is youth development.  The first part of the program, a volunteer must demonstrate proficiency to his or her instructor within the chosen discipline. This is followed by training in youth development.  Students then divide up and demonstrate their training skills by training other students and receive their certificates.  To run a program all volunteers must register and participate in orientation with their Extension Educator.

Youth Development

Students in school grades 4 through 12 are welcome to participate.  Age is less important than maturity, the ability to follow rules, and the motor skills to handle a firearm or bow safely.

The 4-H slogan is "Learn by doing".  Students are given a period of classroom training followed by hands on training.  As students develop skills they are encouraged to assist younger students as coaches.  This allows students to develop skills and confidence leading to true self-esteem.  Not all students will excel academically nor will they excel athletically, shooting sports is one area where size, physical strength and memorization skills are not necessary to achieve excellence.

Venues

While 4-H provides the education, training, and support to start a program, many programs are run and financed through local gun clubs.  Gun clubs often provide ranges, rifles, bows, targets, arrows and ammunition for the program.  Many clubs are looking for qualified people to run a youth shooting sports program.

Safety

Knowledge of and practice of safe handling of bows and firearms is a primary concern of 4-H Safety Education in Shooting Sports. Students are drilled in safe handling procedures and are encouraged to develop at their own pace.

References

Shooting sports organizations
4-H